The Isle of Wight Wightlink Warriors (formerly Islanders) are a British speedway team. They last competed in the 2019 National Development League and ride their home meetings at the Smallbrook Stadium.

History
Isle of Wight speedway began at the Smallbrook Stadium in the 1996 Speedway Conference League. The team known as the Ryde Wight Wizards finished 4th in the table. The following season they entered two teams for the league seasons; the Isle of Wight Warriors competed in the Premier League (division 2) and the Wizards became the junior team competing in the Conference League.

The Islanders continued to participate in the Premier League until 2009. They won the Premier League Pairs Championship in 2007 when Chris Holder and Jason Bunyan beat Glasgow in the final. They also won the Premier League Four-Team Championship at Peterborough in 2007 with a team of Chris Holder, Jason Bunyan, Krzysztof Stojanowski, Glen Phillips and Cory Gathercole defeating King's Lynn, Somerset and Rye House in the final.

In 2010, they joined the third division and after a break of two years (2014 and 2015), the club reformed in 2016 under the promotion of Barry Bishop and Martin Widman and ran until the cancelled 2020 season. In 2021, the club announced they would not be competing during the year.

Notable Riders

Season summary

Riders previous seasons

2020 team

 Ben Morley
 Connor Coles
 Tom Woolley
 Scott Campos
 Chad Wirtzfeld
 Connor King
 Macauley Leek

2019 team

 Georgie Wood
 Ben Morley
 Danno Verge
 Scott Campos
 Connor King
 Chad Wirtzfeld
 Chris Widman

2016 team

 Mark Baseby
 James Cockle
 Nathan Stoneman
 Lee Smart
 Chris Widman
 Kelsey Dugard
 Layne Cupitt

2013 team

 Adam Ellis
 Ben Hopwood
 Tom Perry
 Darryl Ritchings
 Byron Bekker
 Danny Stoneman
 Brandon Freemantle
 Tom Young (replaced Byron Bekker)

2012 team

 Danny Warwick
 Aaron Baseby
 Paul Starke
 Ben Hopwood
 Kyle Hughes
 Danny Stoneman
 Adam Ellis
Also Rode
 Mark Baseby
 Ross Walter
 Steven Jones
 Nick Simmons
 Marc Owen
 Rikki Mullins

2011 team

 Paul Starke
 Rob Smith
 Lee Smethills
 Brendan Johnson
 Nick Simmons
 Tom Hill
 John Rech

2009 team

 Tom Brown
 Ben Hopwood
 Chris Johnson
 Brendan Johnson
 Nick Simmons
 Scott Meakins
 Tom Hill

2008 team

 Jason Bunyan
 Glen Phillps
 Krzysztof Stojanowski
 Paul Fry
 Cory Gathercole
 James Holder
 Andrew Bargh
 Richard Sweetman

References

Speedway Premier League teams
National League speedway teams
Sport on the Isle of Wight